Igor Treybal (born 27 March 1930) is a Czech former sports shooter. He competed at the 1952 Summer Olympics and 1956 Summer Olympics.

References

External links
 

1930 births
Possibly living people
Czech male sport shooters
Olympic shooters of Czechoslovakia
Shooters at the 1952 Summer Olympics
Shooters at the 1956 Summer Olympics
Place of birth missing (living people)